Gertrude Warden (1859–1925) was an English actress and writer, who wrote over 30 novels under her stage name, her name at birth being Gertrude Isobel Price and her married name Mrs John Wilton Jones.

Life
Warden began life as Gertrude Isobel Price, the daughter of a stockbroker. Born in Hanworth, Middlesex, she was educated in Brighton and France. After a brief stint as a governess, Warden became an actress, working in both the London and provincial theatres, as well as touring America with Lillie Langtry. She performed in Judah at the Shaftesbury Theatre with Bessie Hatton in 1890. She married John Wilton Jones, an actor and writer in 1889, and the couple collaborated on plays together, but he died in 1897.  She remarried Auguste Devot de Quillacq in 1899. She was a member of the Women Writers' Suffrage League (WWSL).

One of her sisters also became a writer, adopting the name Florence Warden.

Gertrude died in France in 1925.

Selected works

Notes

References

External links
The Sentimental Sex online at the Library of Congress, full text
Her Fairy Prince online at the Library of Congress, full text
Gertrude Warden
The Illustrated Sporting & Dramatic News Saturday January 6, 1886

1859 births
1925 deaths
English novelists
English stage actresses